FDH may refer to:

Biology, health and medicine 
 (-)-Endo-fenchol dehydrogenase]

Other uses 
 Daglish railway station, in Western Australia
 FDH Bank, Malawi
 Freies Deutsches Hochstift, a foundation in Frankfurt, Germany
 Frères des Hommes, a French aid organization
 Friedrichshafen Airport in Friedrichshafen, Germany
 Full Domain Hash